Drilliola megalacme is a species of sea snail, a marine gastropod mollusk in the family Borsoniidae.

Description
The species has a small, conical shell with its spire well raised and is fairly solid. Its colour is whitish-brown, with a white protoconch. It has six turreted whorls that are regularly increasing. Below the carina appear numerous longitudinal riblets, decussated by spiral carinations, giving the shell a somewhat prickly or nodulous appearance. The mouth is small, with a well-marked sinuation above.

Distribution
This species occurs in European waters along Portugal.

References

 Gofas, S.; Le Renard, J.; Bouchet, P. (2001). Mollusca, in: Costello, M.J. et al. (Ed.) (2001). European register of marine species: a check-list of the marine species in Europe and a bibliography of guides to their identification. Collection Patrimoines Naturels, 50: pp. 180–213

megalacme